Franklin Osei (born 14 October 1993) is a Ghanaian professional footballer who plays as a midfielder for Ghanaian Premier League side Karela United.

Career

Karela United 
Osei has been featuring for Karela United since their entry into the Ghana Premier League in 2018. He made 4 league appearances in the 2018 Ghanaian Premier League season before the league was brought to a halt due to the dissolution of the GFA in June 2018, as a result of the Anas Number 12 Expose. In the 2019–20 Ghana Premier League season, he made nine league appearances and scored one goal before the league was put on hold and later cancelled due to the COVID-19 pandemic.

He was named on the team's squad list for the 2020–21 Ghana Premier League. On 29 November 2020, he scored a brace in a 2–1 win against Dreams FC. He scored in both halves of the match to help Karela come from behind and win the match. He was named the man of the match at the end of the game.

References

External links 

 

Living people
1993 births
Association football midfielders
Ghanaian footballers
Karela United FC players